To the Aid of Stonewall Jackson is an American silent film produced by Kalem Company and directed by Sidney Olcott with Gene Gauntier in the leading role. The action takes place during the Civil War.

Cast
 Gene Gauntier - Nan, the Girl Spy

Production notes
 The film was shot in Jacksonville, Florida.

External links

 To the Aid of Stonewall Jackson website dedicated to Sidney Olcott

1911 films
Silent American drama films
American silent short films
Films set in Florida
Films shot in Jacksonville, Florida
Films directed by Sidney Olcott
1911 short films
1911 drama films
American black-and-white films
American Civil War films
1910s American films